Amaterasu, also known as Amaterasu Ōmikami or Ōhirume no Muchi no Kami, is the goddess of the sun in Japanese mythology. One of the major deities (kami) of Shinto, she is also portrayed in Japan's earliest literary texts, the Kojiki (c. 712 CE) and the Nihon Shoki (720 CE), as the ruler (or one of the rulers) of the heavenly realm Takamagahara and the mythical ancestress of the Imperial House of Japan via her grandson Ninigi. Along with her siblings, the moon deity Tsukuyomi and the impetuous storm god Susanoo, she is considered to be one of the "Three Precious Children", the three most important offspring of the creator god Izanagi.

Amaterasu's chief place of worship, the Grand Shrine of Ise in Ise, Mie Prefecture, is one of Shinto's holiest sites and a major pilgrimage center and tourist spot. As with other Shinto kami, she is also enshrined in a number of Shinto shrines throughout Japan.

Name
The goddess is referred to as 'Amaterasu Ōmikami' ( / ; historical orthography: , Amaterasu Ohomikami; Old Japanese: Amaterasu Opomi1kami2) in the Kojiki, while the Nihon Shoki gives the following variant names:

Ōhirume-no-Muchi (hist. orthography: , Ohohirume-no-Muchi; Old Japanese: Opopi1rume1-no2-Muti)
Amaterasu Ō(mi)kami (hist. orthography: , Amaterasu Oho(mi)kami)
Amaterasu Ōhirume no Mikoto
Hi-no-Kami (OJ: Pi1-no-Kami2)

'Amaterasu' is thought to derive from the verb amateru "to illuminate / shine in the sky" (ama "sky, heaven" + teru "to shine") combined with the honorific auxiliary verb -su, while 'Ōmikami' means "great [and] august deity" (ō "great" + honorific prefix mi- + kami). Notably, 'Amaterasu' in 'Amaterasu Ōmikami' is not technically a name the same way 'Susanoo' in 'Susa no O no Mikoto' or 'Ōkuninushi' in 'Ōkuninushi no Kami' are. Amaterasu is an attributive verb form that modifies the noun after it, ōmikami. This epithet is therefore, much more semantically transparent than most names recorded in the Kojiki and Nihon Shoki, in that it means exactly what it means, without allusion, inference or etymological opacity, literally "The Great August Goddess Who Augustly Shines in Heaven". This usage is analogous to the use of relative clauses in English, only different in that Japanese clauses are placed in front of the noun they modify. This is further exemplified by (1) an alternative epithet, 'Amateru Kami' (天照神, "The Goddess Who Shines in Heaven"), which is a plain, non-honorific version of 'Amaterasu Ōmikami', (2) alternative forms of the verb amaterasu used elsewhere, for example its continuative form amaterashi in the Nihon Sandai Jitsuroku, and (3) similar uses of attributive verb forms in certain epithets, such as Emperor Jinmu's Hatsu Kunishirasu Sumeramikoto (始馭天下之天皇, "His Majesty Who First Rules the Land"). There are, still, certain verb forms that are treated as proper names, such as the terminal negative fukiaezu in 'Ugayafukiaezu no Mikoto' (鸕鷀草葺不合尊, "His Augustness, Incompletely-Thatched-with-Comoran-Feathers")

Her other name, 'Ōhirume', is usually understood as meaning "great woman of the sun / daytime" (cf. hiru "day(time), noon", from hi "sun, day" + me "woman, lady"), though alternative etymologies such as "great spirit woman" (taking hi to mean "spirit") or "wife of the sun" (suggested by Orikuchi Shinobu, who put forward the theory that Amaterasu was originally conceived of as the consort or priestess of a male solar deity) had been proposed. A possible connection with the name Hiruko (the child rejected by the gods Izanagi and Izanami and one of Amaterasu's siblings) has also been suggested. To this name is appended the honorific muchi, which is also seen in a few other theonyms such as 'Ō(a)namuchi' or 'Michinushi-no-Muchi' (an epithet of the three Munakata goddesses).

As the ancestress of the imperial line, the epithet 'Sume(ra)-Ō(mi)kami' (lit. "great imperial deity"; also read as 'Kōtaijin') is also applied to Amaterasu in names such as 'Amaterasu Sume(ra) Ō(mi)kami' (also read as 'Tenshō Kōtaijin') and 'Amaterashimasu-Sume(ra)-Ōmikami'.

During the medieval and early modern periods, the deity was also referred to as 'Tenshō Daijin' (the on'yomi of ) or 'Amateru Ongami' (an alternate reading of the same).

The name 'Amaterasu Ōmikami' has been translated into English in different ways. While a number of authors such as Donald Philippi rendered it as "heaven-illuminating great deity," Basil Hall Chamberlain argued (citing the authority of Motoori Norinaga) that it is more accurately understood to mean "shining in heaven" (because the auxiliary su is merely honorific, not causative, so such interpretation as "to make heaven shine" would be miss the mark), and accordingly translated it as "Heaven-Shining-Great-August-Deity". Gustav Heldt's 2014 translation of the Kojiki, meanwhile, renders it as "the great and mighty spirit Heaven Shining."

Mythology

In classical mythology

Birth

Both the Kojiki (ca. 712 CE) and the Nihon Shoki (720 CE) agree in their description of Amaterasu as the daughter of the god Izanagi and the elder sister of Tsukuyomi, the deity of the moon, and Susanoo, the god of storms and seas. The circumstances surrounding the birth of these three deities, known as the "Three Precious Children" (mihashira no uzu no miko or sankishi), however, vary between sources:

In the Kojiki, Amaterasu, Tsukuyomi and Susanoo were born when Izanagi went to "[the plain of] Awagihara by the river-mouth of Tachibana in Himuka in [the island of] Tsukushi" and bathed (misogi) in the river to purify himself after visiting Yomi, the underworld, in a failed attempt to rescue his deceased wife, Izanami. Amaterasu was born when Izanagi washed his left eye, Tsukuyomi was born when he washed his right eye, and Susanoo was born when he washed his nose. Izanagi then appoints Amaterasu to rule Takamagahara (the "Plain of High Heaven"), Tsukuyomi the night, and Susanoo the seas.
The main narrative of the Nihon Shoki has Izanagi and Izanami procreating after creating the Japanese archipelago; to them were born (in the following order) Ōhirume-no-Muchi (Amaterasu), Tsukuyomi, the 'leech-child' Hiruko, and Susanoo:

A variant legend recorded in the Shoki has Izanagi begetting Ōhirume (Amaterasu) by holding a bronze mirror in his left hand, Tsukuyomi by holding another mirror in his right hand, and Susanoo by turning his head and looking sideways.
A third variant in the Shoki has Izanagi and Izanami begetting the sun, the moon, Hiruko, and Susanoo, as in the main narrative. Their final child, the fire god Kagutsuchi, caused Izanami's death (as in the Kojiki).
A fourth variant relates a similar story to that found in the Kojiki, wherein the three gods are born when Izanagi washed himself in the river of Tachibana after going to Yomi.

Amaterasu and Tsukuyomi
One of the variant legends in the Shoki relates that Amaterasu ordered her brother Tsukuyomi to go down to the terrestrial world (Ashihara-no-Nakatsukuni, the "Central Land of Reed-Plains") and visit the goddess Ukemochi. When Ukemochi vomited foodstuffs out of her mouth and presented them to Tsukuyomi at a banquet, a disgusted and offended Tsukuyomi slew her and went back to Takamagahara. This act upset Amaterasu, causing her to split away from Tsukuyomi, thus separating night from day.

Amaterasu then sent another god, Ame-no-Kumahito, who found various food-crops and animals emerging from Ukemochi's corpse.

Amaterasu had the grains collected and sown for humanity's use and, putting the silkworms in her mouth, reeled thread from them. From this began agriculture and sericulture.

This account is not found in the Kojiki, where a similar story is instead told of Susanoo and the goddess Ōgetsuhime.

Amaterasu and Susanoo

When Susanoo, the youngest of the three divine siblings, was expelled by his father Izanagi for his troublesome nature and incessant wailing on account of missing his deceased mother Izanami, he first went up to Takamagahara to say farewell to Amaterasu. A suspicious Amaterasu went out to meet him dressed in male clothing and clad in armor, at which Susanoo proposed a trial by pledge (ukehi) to prove his sincerity. In the ritual, the two gods each chewed and spat out an object carried by the other (in some variants, an item they each possessed). Five (or six) gods and three goddesses were born as a result; Amaterasu adopted the males as her sons and gave the females – later known as the three Munakata goddesses – to Susanoo.

Susanoo, declaring that he had won the trial as he had produced deities of the required gender, then "raged with victory" and proceeded to wreak havoc by destroying his sister's rice fields and defecating in her palace. While Amaterasu tolerated Susanoo's behavior at first, his "misdeeds did not cease, but became even more flagrant" until one day, he bore a hole in the rooftop of Amaterasu's weaving hall and hurled the "heavenly piebald horse" (ame no fuchikoma), which he had flayed alive, into it. One of Amaterasu's weaving maidens was alarmed and struck her genitals against a weaving shuttle, killing her. In response, a furious Amaterasu shut herself inside the Ame-no-Iwayato ("Heavenly Rock-Cave Door", also known as Ama-no-Iwato), plunging heaven and earth into total darkness.

The main account in the Shoki has Amaterasu wounding herself with the shuttle when Susanoo threw the flayed horse in her weaving hall, while a variant account identifies the goddess who was killed during this incident as Wakahirume-no-Mikoto (lit. "young woman of the sun / day(time)").

Whereas the above accounts identify Susanoo's flaying of the horse as the immediate cause for Amaterasu hiding herself, yet another variant in the Shoki instead portrays it to be Susanoo defecating in her seat:

The Heavenly Rock Cave

After Amaterasu hid herself in the cave, the gods, led by Omoikane, the god of wisdom, conceived a plan to lure her out:

Inside the cave, Amaterasu is surprised that the gods should show such mirth in her absence. Ame-no-Uzume answered that they were celebrating because another god greater than her had appeared. Curious, Amaterasu slid the boulder blocking the cave's entrance and peeked out, at which Ame-no-Koyane and Futodama brought out the mirror (the Yata-no-Kagami) and held it before her. As Amaterasu, struck by her own reflection (apparently thinking it to be the other deity Ame-no-Uzume spoke of), approached the mirror, Ame-no-Tajikarao took her hand and pulled her out of the cave, which was then immediately sealed with a straw rope, preventing her from going back inside. Thus was light restored to the world.

As punishment for his unruly conduct, Susanoo was then driven out of Takamagahara by the other gods. Going down to earth, he arrived at the land of Izumo, where he killed the monstrous serpent Yamata no Orochi to rescue the goddess Kushinadahime, whom he eventually married. From the serpent's carcass Susanoo found the sword Ame-no-Murakumo-no-Tsurugi ("Sword of the Gathering Clouds of Heaven"), also known as Kusanagi-no-Tsurugi ( "Grass-Cutting Sword"), which he presented to Amaterasu as a reconciliatory gift.

The subjugation of Ashihara-no-Nakatsukuni

After a time, Amaterasu and the primordial deity Takamimusubi (also known as Takagi-no-Kami) declared that Ashihara-no-Nakatsukuni, which was then being ruled over by Ōkuninushi (also known as Ō(a)namuchi), the descendant (Kojiki) or the son (Shoki) of Susanoo, should be pacified and put under the jurisdiction of their progeny, claiming it to be teeming with "numerous deities which shone with a lustre like that of fireflies, and evil deities which buzzed like flies". Amaterasu ordered Ame-no-Oshihomimi, the firstborn of the five male children born during her contest with Susanoo, to go down to earth and establish his rule over it. However, after inspecting the land below, he deemed it to be in an uproar and refused to go any further. At the advice of Omoikane and the other deities, Amaterasu then dispatched another of her five sons, Ame no Hohi. Upon arriving, however, Ame no Hohi began to curry favor with Ōkuninushi and did not send back any report for three years. The heavenly deities then sent a third messenger, Ame-no-Wakahiko, who also ended up siding with Ōkuninushi and marrying his daughter Shitateruhime. After eight years, a female pheasant was sent to question Ame-no-Wakahiko, who killed it with his bow and arrow. The blood-stained arrow flew straight up to Takamagahara at the feet of Amaterasu and Takamimusubi, who then threw it back to earth with a curse, killing Ame-no-Wakahiko in his sleep.

The preceding messengers having thus failed to complete their task, the heavenly gods finally sent the warrior deities Futsunushi and Takemikazuchi to remonstrate with Ōkuninushi. At the advice of his son Kotoshironushi, Ōkuninushi agreed to abdicate and left the physical realm to govern the unseen spirit world, which was given to him in exchange. The two gods then went around Ashihara-no-Nakatsukuni, killing those who resisted them and rewarding those who rendered submission, before going back to heaven.

With the earth now pacified, Amaterasu and Takamimusubi again commanded Ame-no-Oshihomimi to descend and rule it. He, however, again demurred and suggested that his son Ninigi be sent instead. Amaterasu thus bequeathed to Ninigi, the sword Susanoo gave her, along with the two items used to lure her out of the Ame-no-Iwayato: the mirror Yata-no-Kagami and the jewel Yasakani no Magatama. With a number of gods serving as his retinue, Ninigi came down from heaven to Mount Takachiho in the land of Himuka and built his palace there. Ninigi became the ancestor of the emperors of Japan, while the mirror, jewel, and sword he brought with him became the three sacred treasures of the imperial house.

Emperor Jimmu and the Yatagarasu

Many years later, Ninigi's great-grandson, Kamuyamato-Iwarebiko (later known as Emperor Jimmu), decided to leave Himuka in search of a new home with his elder brother Itsuse. Migrating eastward, they encountered various gods and local tribes who either submitted to them or resisted them. After Itsuse died of wounds sustained during a battle against a chieftain named Nagasunehiko, Iwarebiko retreated and went to Kumano, located on the southern part of the Kii Peninsula. While there, he and his army were enchanted by a god in the shape of a giant bear and fell into a deep sleep. At that moment, a local named Takakuraji had a dream in which Amaterasu and Takamimusubi commanded the god Takemikazuchi to help Iwarebiko. Takemikazuchi then dropped his sword, Futsu-no-Mitama, into Takakuraji's storehouse, ordering him to give it to Iwarebiko. Upon waking up and discovering the sword inside the storehouse, Takakuraji went to where Iwarebiko was and presented it to him. The magic power of the Futsu-no-Mitama immediately exterminated the evil gods of the region and roused Iwarebiko and his men from their slumber.

Continuing their journey, the army soon found themselves stranded in the mountains. Takamimusubi (so the Kojiki) or Amaterasu (Shoki) then told Iwarebiko in a dream that the giant crow Yatagarasu would be sent to guide them in their way. Soon enough, the bird appeared and led Iwarebiko and his men to safety. At length, Iwarebiko arrived at the land of Yamato (modern Nara Prefecture) and defeated Nagasunehiko, thereby avenging his brother Itsuse. He then established his palace-capital at Kashihara and ruled therein.

Enshrinement in Ise

An anecdote concerning Emperor Sujin relates that Amaterasu (via the Yata-no-Kagami and the Kusanagi sword) and Yamato-no-Ōkunitama, the tutelary deity of Yamato, were originally worshiped in the great hall of the imperial palace. When a series of plagues broke out during Sujin's reign, he "dreaded [...] the power of these Gods, and did not feel secure in their dwelling together." He thus entrusted the mirror and the sword to his daughter Toyosukiirihime, who brought them to the village of Kasanuhi, and delegated the worship of Yamato-no-Ōkunitama to another daughter, Nunakiirihime. When the pestilence showed no sign of abating, he then performed divination, which revealed the plague to have been caused by Ōmononushi, the god of Mount Miwa. When the god was offered proper worship as per his demands, the epidemic ceased.

During the reign of Sujin's son and successor, Emperor Suinin, custody of the sacred treasures were transferred from Toyosukiirihime to Suinin's daughter Yamatohime, who took them first to "Sasahata in Uda" to the east of Miwa. Heading north to Ōmi, she then eastwards to Mino and proceeded south to Ise, where she received a revelation from Amaterasu:

This account serves as the origin myth of the Grand Shrine of Ise, Amaterasu's chief place of worship.

Later, when Suinin's grandson Prince Ousu (also known as Yamato Takeru) went to Ise to visit his aunt Yamatohime before going to conquer and pacify the eastern regions on the command of his father, Emperor Keikō, he was given the divine sword to protect him in times of peril. It eventually came in handy when Yamato Takeru was lured onto an open grassland by a treacherous chieftain, who then set fire to the grass to entrap him. Desperate, Yamato Takeru used the sword to cut the grass around him (a variant in the Shoki has the sword miraculously mow the grass of its own accord) and lit a counter-fire to keep the fire away. This incident explains the sword's name ("Grass Cutter"). On his way home from the east, Yamato Takeru – apparently blinded by hubris – left the Kusanagi in the care of his second wife, Miyazuhime of Owari, and went to confront the god of Mount Ibuki on his own. Without the sword's protection, he fell prey to the god's enchantment and became ill and died afterwards. Thus the Kusanagi stayed in Owari, where it was enshrined in the shrine of Atsuta.

Empress Jingū and Amaterasu's aramitama

At one time, when Emperor Chūai was on a campaign against the Kumaso tribes of Kyushu, his consort Jingū was possessed by unknown gods who told Chūai of a land rich in treasure located on the other side of the sea that is his for the taking. When Chūai doubted their words and accused them of being deceitful, the gods laid a curse upon him that he should die "without possessing this land." (The Kojiki and the Shoki diverge at this point: in the former, Chūai dies almost immediately after being cursed, while in the latter, he dies of a sudden illness a few months after.)

After Chūai's death, Jingū performed divination to ascertain which gods had spoken to her husband. The deities identified themselves as Tsukisakaki Izu no Mitama Amazakaru Mukatsuhime no Mikoto ("The Awe-inspiring Spirit of the Planted Sakaki, the Lady of Sky-distant Mukatsu", usually interpreted as the aramitama or 'violent spirit' of Amaterasu), Kotoshironushi, and the three gods of Sumie (Sumiyoshi): Uwatsutsunoo, Nakatsutsunoo, and Sokotsutsunoo. Worshiping the gods in accordance with their instructions, Jingū then set out to conquer the promised land beyond the sea: the three kingdoms of Korea.

When Jingū returned victorious to Japan, she enshrined the deities in places of their own choosing; Amaterasu, warning Jingū not to take her aramitama along to the capital, instructed her to install it in Hirota, the harbor where the empress disembarked.

Family

Family tree

Consorts 
She is a virgin goddess and never engages in sexual relationships.

Siblings 
Amaterasu has many siblings most notably Susanoo and  Tsukiyomi. Basil Hall Chamberlain used the words "elder brother" to translate her dialog referring to Susanoo in the Kojiki, even though he noted that she was his elder sister. The word (which was also used by Izanami to address her elder brother and husband Izanagi) was nase (phonetically spelt  in the Kojiki; modern dictionaries use the semantic spelling 汝兄, whose kanji literally mean "thou[, my] elder brother"), an ancient term used only by females to refer to their brothers, who had higher status than them. (As opposed to males using  ( in the Kojiki) to refer to their sisters, who had lower status than them.) The Nihon Shoki used the Chinese word  ("younger brother") instead.

Some tellings say she had a sister named  Wakahirume who was a weaving maiden and helped Amaterasu weave clothes for the other kami in heaven. Wakahirume was later accidentally killed by Susanoo.

Other traditions say she had an older brother named Hiruko.

Descendants 

Amaterasu has 5 sons Ame-no-oshihomimi, Ame no Hohi, Amatsuhikone, Ikutsuhikone, and Kumanokusubi, who were given birth to by Susanoo by chewing her hair jewels. According to one account in the Nihon Shoki, it was because these children were male that Susanoo won during the ritual to prove his intent, even though they were not his children, but hers. This explanation of the outcome of the ritual contradicts that in the Kojiki, according to which it was because she gave birth to female children using his sword, and those children were his. The Kojiki claims he won because he had daughters to whom she gave birth, while the Nihon Shoki claims he won because he himself gave birth to her sons. Several figures and noble clans claim descent from Amaterasu most notably the Japanese imperial family through Emperor Jimmu who descended from her grandson Ninigi.

Her son Ame no Hohi is considered the ancestral kami of clans in Izumo which includes the Haji clan, Sugawara clan, and the Senge clan. The legendary sumo wrestler Nomi no Sukune is believed to be a 14th generation descendant of Amenohohi.

Worship

The Ise Grand Shrine ( Ise Jingū) located in Ise, Mie Prefecture, Japan, houses the inner shrine, Naiku, dedicated to Amaterasu. Her sacred mirror, Yata no Kagami, is said to be kept at this shrine as one of the Imperial regalia objects. New shrine buildings are built at a location adjacent to the site first. After the transfer of the object of worship, new clothing and treasure and offering food to the goddess the old buildings are taken apart. The building materials taken apart are given to many other shrines and buildings to renovate. This practice is a part of the Shinto faith and has been practiced since the year 690 CE, but is not only for Amaterasu but also for many other deities enshrined in Ise Grand Shrine. Additionally, from the late 7th century to the 14th century, an unmarried princess of the Imperial Family, called "Saiō" or itsuki no miko, served as the sacred priestess of Amaterasu at the Ise Shrine upon every new dynasty.

The  in Takachiho, Miyazaki Prefecture, Japan is also dedicated to Amaterasu and sits above the gorge containing Ama-no-Iwato.

The worship of Amaterasu to the exclusion of other kami has been described as "the cult of the sun." This phrase may also refer to the early pre-archipelagoan worship of the sun.

According to the Engishiki and Sandai Jitsuroku of the Heian period, the sun goddess had many shrines named "Amateru" or "Amateru-mitama", which were mostly located in the Kinki area. However, there have also been records of a shrine on Tsushima Island, coined as either "Teruhi Gongen" or the "Shining Sun Deity" during medieval times. It was later found that such a shrine was meant for a male sun deity named Ameno-himitama.

Amaterasu was also once worshiped at Hinokuma shrines. The Hinokuma shrines were used to worship the goddess by the Ama people in the Kii Provinces. Because the Ama people were believed to have been fishermen, researchers have conjectured that the goddess was also worshiped for a possible connection to the sea.

Differences in worship 
Amaterasu, while primarily being the goddess of the sun, is also sometimes worshiped as having connections with other aspects and forms of nature. Amaterasu can also be considered a goddess of the wind and typhoons alongside her brother, and even possibly death. There are many connections between local legends in the Ise region with other goddesses of nature, such as a nameless goddess of the underworld and sea. It's possible that Amaterasu's name became associated with these legends in the Shinto religion as it grew throughout Japan.

One source interprets from the Heavenly Rock Cave myth that Amaterasu was seen as being responsible for the normal cycle of day and night.

In contrast, Amaterasu, while enshrined at other locations, also can be seen as the goddess that represents Japan and its ethnicity. The many differences in Shinto religion and mythology can be due to how different local gods and beliefs clashed. In the Meiji Era, the belief in Amaterasu fought against the Izumo belief in Ōkuninushi for spiritual control over the land of Japan. During this time, the religious nature of Okininushi may have been changed to be included in Shinto mythology. Osagawara Shouzo built shrines in other countries to mainly spread Japan's culture and Shinto religion. It, however, was usually seen as the worshiping of Japan itself, rather than Amaterasu. Most of these colonial and oversea shrines were destroyed after WWII.

Other worshiped forms

Snake 
Outside of being worshiped as a sun goddess, some have argued that Amaterasu was once related to snakes. There was a legend circulating among the Ise Priests that essentially described an encounter of Amaterasu sleeping with the Saiō every night in the form of a snake or lizard, evidenced by fallen scales in the priestess' bed. This was recorded by a medieval monk in his diary, which stated that "in ancient times Amaterasu was regarded as a snake deity or as a sun deity." In the Ise kanjō, the god's snake form is considered an embodiment of the "three poisons", namely greed, anger, and ignorance. Amaterasu is also linked to a snake cult, which is also tied to the theory that the initial gender of the goddess was male.

Dragon 
In general, some of these Amaterasu–dragon associations have been in reference to Japanese plays. One example has been within the Chikubushima tradition in which the dragon goddess Benzaiten was the emanation of Amaterasu. Following that, in the Japanese epic, Taiheki, one of the characters, Nitta Yoshisada, made comparisons with Amaterasu and a dragon with the quote: “I have heard that the Sun Goddess of Ise … conceals her true being in the august image of Vairocana, and that she has appeared in this world in the guise of a dragon god of the blue ocean.”

Another tradition of the Heavenly Cave story depicts Amaterasu as a "dragon-fox" (shinko or tatsugitsune) during her descent to the famed cave because it is a type of animal/kami that emits light from its entire body.

Relation to women's positions in early Japanese society 
Because Amaterasu has the highest position among the Shinto deities, there has been debate on her influence and relation to women's positions in early Japanese society. Some scholars have argued that the goddess' presence and high stature within the kami system could suggest that early rulers in Japan were female. Others have argued the goddess' presence implies strong influences female priests had in Japanese politics and religion.

See also
First sunrise
Himiko
List of solar deities
Zalmoxis
Ōkami Amaterasu
Tokapcup-kamuy
Shinto in popular culture
Solar Myths

Notes

References

External links

Ise Grand Shrine
Japanese goddesses
Kumano faith
Shinto kami
Solar goddesses
Sky and weather goddesses
Wind goddesses
Personifications
Amatsukami